Philopota is a genus of small-headed flies in the family Acroceridae. It is the type genus of the subfamily Philopotinae.

Species

 Philopota amazonensis Gillung & Nihei, 2016
 Philopota castanea Gillung & Nihei, 2016
 Philopota conica Wiedemann, 1830
 Philopota costaricensis Gillung & Nihei, 2016
 Philopota dissimilis Gillung & Nihei, 2016
 Philopota flavimaculata Gillung & Nihei, 2016
 Philopota flavolateralis Brunetti, 1926
 Philopota fuscofemorata Gillung & Nihei, 2016
 Philopota grossii Gillung & Nihei, 2016
 Philopota histrio Erichson, 1840
 Philopota liturata Westwood, 1848
 Philopota longirostris Gillung & Nihei, 2016
 Philopota lugubris Williston, 1901
 Philopota minuta Gillung & Nihei, 2016
 Philopota multivenata Gillung & Nihei, 2016
 Philopota schlingeri Gillung & Nihei, 2016
 Philopota semicincta Schiner, 1868
 Philopota tepicensis Gillung & Nihei, 2016
 Philopota truquii Bellardi, 1859
 Philopota tuberculata Westwood, 1848
 Philopota turbinata Erichson, 1840
 Philopota vitrialata Gillung & Nihei, 2016

References

Acroceridae
Taxa named by Christian Rudolph Wilhelm Wiedemann
Nemestrinoidea genera